Salah Mansour, (Feb 03, 1923 – Jan 19, 1979) was an Egyptian movie actor known for his roles in Lan A'taref and Al-Zawga Al-Thaneya. He started in school theater, and graduated from the Egyptian acting institute in 1947. He worked in artistic-editing then joined the theater. Later he was a consultant in the Egyptian Ministry of Education

He died on January 19, 1979.

Early life 
Salah Mansour was born in Shibin Al-Qanater, in Al-Qalyubia, Egypt.

Awards 
 He was awarded for his roles in Lan A'taref (I'll never confess) - 1963 as well as Al-Zawga Al-Thaneya (The second wife) - 1968
 He received the Egyptian Evaluative Award - 1966
 Art Academy at Eid Al-Fan - Oct 8, 1978
 Order of Sciences and Arts, 2014

External links 
 
 https://web.archive.org/web/20031005022930/http://adabwafan.com/browse/entity.asp?id=21253 (Arabic)

Egyptian film directors
1923 births
1979 deaths